Route 120 is a New Brunswick highway in Madawaska County that runs from a junction with Quebec Route 289 at Saint-Jean-de-la-Lande, Quebec, to New Brunswick Route 2 in Edmundston.

Communities
 Lac-Baker
 Portage-du-Lac
 Caron Brook
 Baker Brook
 Saint-Hilaire
 Verret
 Edmundston

See also
List of New Brunswick provincial highways

References

120
120
Transport in Edmundston